The Louisiana Independent School Association (1970-1992), more commonly known as LISA, was an athletic association created to offer interscholastic sports at all-white segregation academies in the state of Louisiana.  The organization is no longer in existence.

In its ruling on Brumfield v. Dodd (1975), the U.S. District Court for the Eastern District of Louisiana described LISA as "an organization of private schools which publicly maintains a racist policy and has advised its members openly how to discourage black enrollment."

History 
The organization was founded amid a wave of new private schools that were being opened in response to most Louisiana public schools being desegregated in the 1969-70 or 1970-71 school year. Its public-school equivalent was the Louisiana High School Athletic Association.

Its charter meeting was held in April 1970; it launched that fall with 20 member schools, a number that increased to 54 by the following school year. LISA's logo, reflecting its segregated origins, featured the Confederate battle flag. No Black athlete played in a LISA all-star game until 1991.

By the 1980s, as segregation academies closed or moved to the LHSAA, membership declined. In October 1991, LISA's members voted unanimously to merge into the equivalent association in Mississippi, the Mississippi Private School Association (now the Midsouth Association of Independent Schools. LISA held its last competition in 1992 and ceased to exist as a corporate entity on November 17, 1997.

Organization 
Schools competed in two divisions, A and AA, according to enrollment, with districts arranged by geography and traditional rivalries. Postseason all-star games were held in football and basketball. 

LISA’s competitive sports programs included baseball, softball, basketball, cross country, track and field, and football.

Former Member Schools

References 

High school sports in Louisiana
High school sports associations in the United States
Segregation academies in Louisiana
Private and independent school organizations in the United States